Hairy Hill is a hamlet in Alberta, Canada within the County of Two Hills No. 21.

Hairy Hill got its name from the large amount of bison hair found on the hills in the area when the Canadian Pacific Railway founded the hamlet in the early 20th century.

Demographics 
Hairy Hill recorded a population of 30 in the 2001 Census of Population conducted by Statistics Canada.

See also 
List of communities in Alberta
List of former urban municipalities in Alberta
List of hamlets in Alberta

References 

Hamlets in Alberta
Former villages in Alberta
Populated places disestablished in 1996
County of Two Hills No. 21